The 1973 Benson & Hedges British Open Championships was held at Abbeydale Park in Sheffield from 27 January - 2 February 1973. Jonah Barrington won his sixth title defeating Gogi Alauddin in the final. This sixth success took him to just one behind the record set by Hashim Khan, but it was also to be the last title victory for Barrington.

Seeds

Draw and results

First round

Second round to final

References

Men's British Open Squash Championships
Squash in England
Men's British Open
Men's British Open Squash Championship
1970s in Sheffield
Sports competitions in Sheffield
Men's British Open Squash Championship
Men's British Open Squash Championship